The First Congregational Church of Bennington, also known as the Old First Church, is a historic church in Old Bennington, Vermont.   The congregation was organized in 1762 and the current meeting house was built in 1805.  The building, one of the state's best examples of Federal period religious architecture, was added to the National Register of Historic Places in 1973.

Description and history
The Old First Church occupies a prominent position facing the green in the center of Old Bennington, at the junction of Monument Avenue and Church Lane near the southern end of the green.  It is a two-story rectangular wood-frame structure, with a projecting entry vestibule and multi-stage tower.  The gabled roof has a modillioned eave, and the exterior is finished in wooden clapboards with quoined corners.  The entry vestibule is also gabled, with two round-arch entrances flanking a larger central entrance, which is topped by a rounded transom and gable.  The second level of the vestibule has a large Palladian window with broken pediment above, and there is a half-round window in the pediment above.  The tower has pilastered corners, with a smaller Palladian window in the first stage, an open second stage octagonal belfry, and an octagonal cupola at the top.

The church congregation was organized in 1762, and its first meetinghouse was built in 1766.  Due to increased participation, this building, with a seating capacity of six hundred fifty, was built in 1805, funded by the sale of pews and local levies.  It was designed by builder Lavius Fillmore, who apparently borrowed heavily from Plate 35 of Asher Benjamin's The Country Builder's Assistant.

Old Bennington Cemetery
The adjacent cemetery Old Bennington Cemetery, also known as Old First Church Cemetery or Old First Congregational Church Cemetery, was designated by the Vermont legislature as "Vermont's Sacred Acre".  It is the burial site of poet Robert Frost.

See also
National Register of Historic Places listings in Bennington County, Vermont

References

External links

Old First Church web site

Churches on the National Register of Historic Places in Vermont
Churches completed in 1805
19th-century churches in the United States
Churches in Bennington County, Vermont
Congregational churches in Vermont
1805 establishments in Vermont
Buildings and structures in Bennington, Vermont
National Register of Historic Places in Bennington County, Vermont
Historic district contributing properties in Vermont